The Taichung Dreamers Academy is a Taiwanese basketball team based in Taichung, Taiwan. The team is composed of amateur and student players. They competed in various basketball tournaments.

History
The team is founded in 2020 by a group of Formosa Dreamers fans, whom had supported the Dreamers since the seasons they competed in the ASEAN Basketball League. The team held its first public tryout games on June 19 and 20, 2020 at Huizhong Basketball Court. On June 24, 2020, the team revealed the roster for their upcoming Guang-Sheng Basketball Cup games.

Players

Current roster

 

|-
|}
| style="vertical-align:top;" |
 Coach
 Tsai Yao-Hsun

Updated: November 5, 2022
|}

Former players who have ever joined professional team

Coaches and staff
Honorary head coach – Alex Tan
Executive coach – Tsai Yao-Hsun
Representative – Chan Cheng-Hsing
Vice Representative – Lin Chi-Fu
Vice Representative – Wang Chi-Lun
Vice Representative – Hsu Ting-Jui
Marketing Management – Chang Chia-Lun
Marketing Business – Liu Ying-Chun
Marketing Business – Yang Chia-Ju
Marketing Business – Chao Yen-Hsin

Reference：

Results

Summary

3X3.EXE Premier Chinese Taipei

References

External links
 
  
  
 

2020 establishments in Taiwan
Basketball teams established in 2020
Sport in Taichung